AS Manu-Ura is a French Polynesian football team based in Papeete, currently playing in the Tahiti First Division, the top football league in Tahiti. Formed in 1953, AS Manu Ura has a strong history in domestic and regional football with five league titles and three Coupe de Polynesie crowns to their name.

Recent seasons
The side has been a dominant force in Tahitian football between 2007 and 2010. The club won a hat-trick of league titles from 2007 to 2009, twice qualifying for the OFC Champions League. In 2010 the club finished top of the league table however they only managed fifth in the Championship Play-Off resulting in the title and Champions League qualification going to rivals AS Tefana.

Achievements
Tahiti First Division: 5
 1996, 2004, 2007, 2008, 2009.

Tahiti Cup: 2 
 2003, 2005.

Tahiti Coupe des Champions: 1 
 2008.

Pacific French Territories Cup: 2
 1996, 2004.

Continental Record

Last seasons

The club in the French football structure
French Cup : 3 appearances
 2003–04, 2005–06, 2009–10

Performance in OFC competitions
OFC Champions League: 2 appearances
Best: 3° in Group A 2008 and 2010
2008: 3° in Group A
2010: 3° in Group A

Current squad
Squad for the 2019-20 Tahiti Ligue 1

References

External links
 Official site

Football clubs in Tahiti
Football clubs in French Polynesia
Papeete
1953 establishments in French Polynesia
Association football clubs established in 1953